Karaburma is an urban neighborhood of the municipality of Palilula, Belgrade, Serbia. As of 2002, it has a population of 55,343 inhabitants.

Name 

The name, Karaburma, is Turkish for black ring which is supposed to mean that the area was forbidden, that is, it should be avoided by people. However, this may be an example of folk etymology as the old Ottoman and Austrian maps name the area Kajaburun (Kaya-burun) which is Turkish for rocky headland.

Chronicler Milan Milićević confirms this, using also the name Kajaburma as the mid-variant of the name, referring to Karaburma as the "nose" of the hill which descends into the Danube.

Geography 

Karaburma was geographically a headland peaking into the Danube. It was the ending section ("nose" or "point") of the Great Vračar hill, today called Zvezdara, which descended in slopes where modern neighborhoods of Karaburma and Ćalije are today, plunging into the river.

When the neighboring island of Ada Huja was connected to the mainland thus becoming a peninsula, Karaburma's area on the right bank of Danube also became known as Ada Huja, so Karaburma is now a few hundred meters away from the river.

In the expansion of the population of jackals in the outskirts of Belgrade since the 2000s, the animals were reported in Karaburma in the spring of 2022.

History

Antiquity 

The oldest settlement known by name on the territory of modern Belgrade was found in the Karaburma area. Remains of the Celtic (and later Roman) settlement of Singidunum were found near Karaburma and neighboring Rospi Ćuprija, including necropolis (Horseman's grave 16) rich in artifacts and parts of dunum, fortress, so it is believed that the settlement itself was located here. These remains represent a limited archaeological evidence as there were almost no traces left of the Celtic town, except for them. The necropolises contained valuable artistic artifacts which belonged to the warriors of the Scordisci tribe. An apparent Celtic cultural influences have been woven into the spiritual culture of the Singidunum inhabitants, and later mixed with Roman classical cultural elements.

Though it is today generally considered that the old Celtic fortress was located where the modern Belgrade Fortress is, it can't be confirmed as there are no records of where the Celts settled. Some historians suggested that it was rather close to the necropolises in Karaburma and Rospi Ćuprija. Celtic settlements belonged to the La Tène culture.

In the area bounded by the modern Karaburma, Rospi Ćuprija and, at that time island, Ada Huja, Romans cultivated grapevines and used thermal springs for public bathhouses.

Later period 

For centuries area was a true swamp with vast quick clay areas so it was avoided by humans ever since the Roman period. Today non-existing thermal springs along the Danube's bank fumed and heated the water so the swamp was in constant mist. In the 19th century Serbian prince Miloš Obrenović ordered that Karaburma will be the official place of death sentences executions (until 1912) which just added to the notoriety of the area.

Until Belgrade's expansion after the World War I, Karaburma was sparsely inhabited with small and scattered shanty towns. Today it is a modern neighborhood 10 minutes away from downtown Belgrade with good transportation connections.

Before the joint German-Austro-Hungarian occupation of Serbia in World War I, Austro-Hungarian army temporarily entered Belgrade, from 3 to 14 December 1914. Already on 4 December they erected gallows in Karaburma for hanging civilians, so as in several other locations around the town.

Interbellum 

A whole string of new neighborhoods encircled eastern outskirts of Belgrade, with names usually containing "suburb" and some member of the royal family. These original names either never became popular or were suppressed after World War II and replaced. It consisted of 40 one-floor houses with gardens, indented from the main street. This style became very popular across the Europe. Two such suburbs originated on territory of modern Karaburma, Suburb of King Alexander Karađorđević and Suburb of Prince Paul Karađorđević.

The rapid development of Karaburma during the Interbellum is connected with the development of the textile industry and the business enterprises of the Ilić family, especially Vlada Ilić was an industrialist and mayor of Belgrade from 1935 to 1939. In 1897, German entrepreneurs Eugen Michael and Carl Wolf founded a cloth factory in Karaburma, near the modern Velje Miljkovića Street. Kosta Ilić, father of Vlada, purchased the factory in 1906, in partnership with his sons. In 1910 the company was transformed into the joint-stock company with the capital of 3,000,000 dinars in gold. Prior to World War I, the Ilić brothers acquired the latest English technology for the cloth production as they bought the "Crompton Ltd", a Belgrade branch of the "Ungarische Tehtilindustrie". "Crompton Ltd", a successor of "Hattersley & Crompton", had looms made by the latest Hattersley technology, which boosted the production. After his brother Sotir died in 1935, Vlada took over as a sole head of the conglomerate. Company was boosted when the new contract was signed with the Yugoslav Army in 1939.

After acquiring the Michael's factory in 1906 in Karaburma, Ilić sequestered a room and adapted it into the school for the children of his workers. He personally paid the teacher's wages. As the factory complex expanded and number of workers grew, the provisional school became too small, so Ilić rented the upper floor of the nearby Lavadinović kafana, still fully financed by him. The local population objected that a school and kafana share a building. Named elementary school "Cloth Factory Ilić", it was built from his donations in 1923. It has been renamed "Jovan Cvijić" in 1931, a name it still bears today. During Ilić's tenure as a mayor, a King Peter II Bridge (today the Pančevo Bridge across the Danube was built and open on 27 October 1935, right at the western edge of Karaburma. A railway from the Belgrade Main railway station, which encircled the central ridge of the city along the rivers, and then continuing over to the King Peter II Bridge was also constructed. He also built apartments in Karaburma for his employees, and even his villa was built on a location close to his factories, though in the western neighborhood of Viline Vode. After the war Ilić was imprisoned and his companies nationalized by the new Communist government. Well known after-war Serbian state owned textile companies, like Beteks, Beko and Vunarski kombinat, some of which were located in Karaburma, developed from Ilić's factories.

Another person who worked on development of Karaburma in this period was deputy mayor Viktor Krstić. He conducted the waterworks in the neighborhood, though only for the public service at first, and built 4 drinking fountains in Karaburma in 1932. He also organized the paving of the streets with kaldrma, a type of cobblestone. On one of the fountains, the inhabitants of Karaburma placed a memorial plaque, thanking Krstić for bringing the water in the neighborhood. None of the fountains survived until today.

Modern period 

After the economic collapse in the 1990s and bankruptcy of the major industrial companies, Karaburma began to change as the vast and neglected, previously heavily industrialized areas, began to deteriorate. Since the 2010s, demolition of several derelict industrial complexes began. In April 2017 a new Big Fashion Mall was open on the lot of the former sportswear and sport equipment kombinat "Sport". In October 2018 it was announced that even larger lot of the former "Minel Kotlogradnja" factory will be demolished. A new residential-commercial complex will be built instead, starting from August 2019. Even larger shopping mall, Big Fashion Park, was opened in this complex in December 2019.

Location 

Karaburma is located between the neighborhoods of Zvezdara (south), Bogoslovija (west), Ada Huja (north), Rospi Ćuprija (east) and Ćalije (southeast). Its entire southern border (Dragoslava Srejovića street) is also municipal border between Palilula and Zvezdara, for the most part dividing it from the Zvezdara woods. Northern border is the Višnjička street while the eastern is the Mirijevo Boulevard.

Administration 

On 1 September 1955, Karaburma became one of the municipalities of Belgrade, but already on 3 January 1957 it was incorporated into the municipality of Palilula.

Today, it roughly consists of several communities: Stara Karaburma (Old Karaburma), the western section, Karaburma-Dunav or Nova Karaburma (Karaburma-Danube or New Karaburma), the eastern section. The south-eastern corner, which extends into Ćalije, is also known as Karaburma II.

Characteristics 

Karaburma is a residential area, and one of the most populous neighborhoods of Belgrade, with a combined population of 34,343 (several local communities which make the neighborhood). Some of distinctive features are two green markets, the VII Belgrade Gymnasium and the stadium of OFK Beograd.

References

Sources 

 Beograd - plan grada; M@gic M@p, 2006; 
 Beograd - plan i vodič; Geokarta, 1999; 

Neighborhoods of Belgrade
Former and proposed municipalities of Belgrade
Archaeological sites in Serbia
Palilula, Belgrade